Grammognatha euphratica is a species of beetle in the family Cicindelidae, the only species in the genus Grammognatha. It was described by Latreille & Dejean in 1822.

References

Cicindelidae
Beetles described in 1822